Shomospur Union is a union parishad of Khoksa Upazila, in Kushtia District, Khulna Division of Bangladesh. There are 10 villages and 10 mouzas in the union.

References

External links
 

Unions of Khulna Division
Unions of Khoksa Upazila
Unions of Kushtia District